The  is a tramway in the cities of Osaka and Sakai, Osaka Prefecture, Japan. Hankai Tramway Co., Ltd. owns and operates the line.

History
The Hankai Line has its origin in the Hankai Tramway Co., Ltd., founded in 1910.  In 1915 the company merged with the Nankai Railway which runs north and south in Osaka.  The city's overall tram network was once extensive.  As motorization developed as an alternative form of transportation along with the construction of subway lines underneath major routes, the trams lost their passengers, causing Osaka's once-extensive tram network to shrink, with the only the Hankai and Uemachi tram lines remaining.  In 1980, Hankai split from Nankai.

Stations
Station numbers are in parentheses.

All trams from Ebisucho go only as far as Abikomichi, while Uemachi Line trains go through from Tennoji-ekimae to Hamadera-ekimae.

See also
Hankai Uemachi Line - the sister line of Hankai Line

References

External links

Hankai Line official site 

 
Rail transport in Osaka Prefecture
Railway lines in Japan
Tram transport in Japan
Railway lines opened in 1910